Louise Henriette de Bourbon (20 June 1726 – 9 February 1759), Mademoiselle de Conti at birth, was a French princess, who, by marriage, became Duchess of Chartres (1743–1752), then Duchess of Orléans (1752–1759) upon the death of her father-in-law. On 4 February 1752, her husband became the head of the House of Orléans, and the First Prince of the Blood (Premier prince du sang), the most important personage after the immediate members of the royal family.

The new Duke of Orléans and his wife were then addressed as Monsieur le Prince and Madame la Princesse. Louise Henriette de Bourbon, Duchess of Orléans, was a grandmother of the French monarch Louis-Philippe King of the French, "the Citizen King". Her descendants include the present-day pretenders to the throne of France and Italy and the kings of Spain and Belgium.

Background
Louise Henriette was born in Paris, the only daughter of Louis Armand de Bourbon, Prince of Conti and Louise Élisabeth de Bourbon. Her father was the second son of François Louis de Bourbon, Prince of Conti known as le Grand Conti and his wife Marie Thérèse de Bourbon. Her paternal grandmother and her maternal grandfather being siblings, her parents were first cousins. Her mother was the oldest and favourite daughter of Louise-Françoise de Bourbon, herself the oldest of the surviving legitimised daughters of Louis XIV and Madame de Montespan. As a member of the reigning House of Bourbon, Louise Henriette was a Princess of the Blood (princesse du sang). In her youth she was known at court as Mademoiselle de Conti. 

Her father died in 1727 due to a "chest swelling". Her father was known to have been abusive to his wife and left her without even having apologised to his wife. As such her oldest surviving brother Louis François de Bourbon (1717–1776) became the Prince of Conti. At the time of her father's death, she was one of three children; her brother the Prince; and another brother Louis Armand de Bourbon, the Duke of Mercœur (1722–1730).

Marriage
One of Louise Henriette's cousins, Louis Jean Marie de Bourbon, Duke of Penthièvre, son of Louis-Alexandre de Bourbon, Count of Toulouse, and heir to the Penthièvre fortune, had proposed marriage to her, but her mother's choice fell upon the heir of the more prestigious House of Orléans. As a result, on 17 December 1743, at the age of seventeen, Louise Henriette married her second cousin, the Duke of Chartres, Louis Philippe d'Orléans, in the chapel of the Palace of Versailles. 

Louise Henriette's mother, Louise Élisabeth de Bourbon, hoped the marriage would put an end to conflict between the House of Bourbon-Condé and the House of Orléans, the source being animosity between Louise Élisabeth's mother, Louise-Françoise de Bourbon, Dowager Princess of Condé, and her aunt, Françoise-Marie de Bourbon, Dowager Duchess of Orléans, who were sisters and legitimised daughters of Louis XIV and Madame de Montespan.  

In 1731, a marriage between the two families had already taken place, that of Henriette's elder brother Louis François I de Bourbon, prince de Conti to Louise Diane d'Orléans. The Duke of Chartres' father, Louis d'Orléans, Duke of Orléans, known as the Pious, accepted his wife's choice because of the princess' upbringing in a convent; however, after a much passionate beginning, Louise Henriette's scandalous behaviour caused the couple to break up.

Among her extramarital affairs, she is said to have had a relationship with the Count of Melfort whom she met at the Château de Saint-Cloud after the birth of her son. During the Revolution of 1789, Philippe-Égalité publicly claimed that his real father was not his mother's husband at all but instead a coachman at the Palais-Royal. This assertion was likely for political reasons to distance the ambitious Duke from the ancien regime. However DNA testing in a 2014 established the Y-chromosome haplogroup and ySTR pattern of the House of Bourbon, and has indeed confirmed the biological legitimacy of Louise Henriette's eldest son, Philippe-Égalité. As part of this project samples were taken from 3 living genealogical descendants of Louis XIII, namely Axel, Prince of Bourbon-Parma; Henri, Prince of Bourbon-Parma, and João Henrique, Prince of Orléans-Braganza. The former 2 are documented male line descendants of Philip V of Spain, who was a grandson of Louis XIV. 

The latter is a direct male line descendant of Philip I, Duke of Orleans - a younger brother of Louis XIV and the ancestor of Louise Henriette's husband. All 3 testers were a genetic partilineal match on a ySTR comparison, and were assigned to sub-haplogroup R1b1b2a1a1b*(R-Z381), now deemed the upstream patrilineal snip of the House of Bourbon.

Issue

The couple had three children:

A daughter (Château de Saint-Cloud, 12 or 13 July 1745 – 14 December 1745, Château de Saint-Cloud);
Louis Philippe Joseph d'Orléans (Château de Saint-Cloud, 13 April 1747, – 6 November 1793, Place de la Révolution, Paris (executed)), who succeeded his father as Duke of Orléans in 1785,
Duke of Montpensier at birth,
Duke of Chartres at the death of his grandfather in 1752,
Duke of Orléans at the death of his father in 1785,
known as Philippe-Égalité during the French Revolution;
possible husband for Princess Kunigunde of Saxony (1740–1826), youngest daughter of Augustus III of Poland;
married Louise Marie Adélaïde de Bourbon, Mademoiselle de Penthièvre, and was the father of Louis-Philippe King of the French;
Louise Marie Thérèse Bathilde d'Orléans (Château de Saint-Cloud, 9 July 1750 – 10 January 1822, Paris), the last princesse de Condé,
possible bride for Ferdinand, Duke of Parma,
married Louis Henry II, Prince of Condé,
known as Mademoiselle at court prior to her marriage,
known as Citoyenne Vérité during the French Revolution.

Death
Louise Henriette died on 9 February 1759 at age 32, with her husband and children at her side, at the Palais-Royal, the Orléans residence in Paris. Her son and daughter were, respectively, eleven and eight years old. After her death, her husband had several mistresses, ultimately finding the love of his life, the witty but married marquise de Montesson, whom he married after she became a widow. Like her mother, who had inherited the title through her Condé's ancestry, Louise Henriette was the duchesse d'Étampes in her own right, having inherited the title on the occasion of her husband's rise to the head of the House of Orléans in 1752. At her death, her son inherited the ducal title, which he held until it became extinct in 1792, during the French Revolution.

In June 1759, shortly after his twelfth birthday, Louis Philippe, her only son, was presented before the court at Versailles, officially meeting King Louis XV and the royal family. Despite their detached relationship, the Duke of Orléans was greatly affected by his wife's death, and so was their son. Louise Henriette was buried at the Val-de-Grâce in Paris.

Ancestry

Notes and references

External links

Documents sur Les Seigneurs et Dames d’Étampes dans le Corpus Étampois (French)

1726 births
Louise Henriette
1759 deaths
Louise Henriette
Louise Henriette
Dukes of Étampes
Louise Henriette
Louise Henriette
Louise Henriette
Louise Henriette
18th-century French nobility
Étampes, Duchess of, Louise Henriette de Bourbon
Nobility from Paris
Louise Henriette
Burials at Val-de-Grâce (church)